In Human Disguise is a Finnish play performed at the Zodiak dance theatre in Kaapelitehdas, Helsinki, in November 2009. The play is for four female performers, who perform the entire play completely naked. One performance of the play is a special event where the audience can also strip naked if they want.

Cast and crew
 Choreography and direction: Eeva Muilu, Milja Sarkola
 Performers: Joanna Haartti, Monika Hartl, Niina Hosiasluoma, Hanna Raiskinmäki

External links
 Ihmisen asussa at Zodiak
 Ihmisen asussa -teos riisuu vaatteet esiintyjiltä ja katsojilta, Helsingin Sanomat online edition, 2 November 2009. Accessed on 6 November 2009.

Finnish plays
2009 plays